13-Point Program to Destroy America is the debut album by the American post-hardcore band Nation of Ulysses.  The album's title is in reference to the Black Panther Party's Ten Point Program and J. Edgar Hoover's propaganda pamphlet "Red China's Secret Plan to Destroy America."  The title of track #13 was inspired by Frank Sinatra's album Love is a Kick.

Tracks 14-16 on the CD are not on the original album, and are taken from their 1991 self-titled 7" debut.

Critical reception
Trouser Press wrote that "singer Ian Svenonius (who doubles on occasional bleating trumpet) has a deeper, throaty quality to his delivery than most DC-style barkers — not quite a Stax/Volt Rollins but a striking combination of ardor and menace that elevates his breathless rage above mere harangue." The Washington Post called the album "so brattily self-conscious that only the ferocity of its attack keeps it from curdling."

Track listing

References

1991 debut albums
Dischord Records albums
The Nation of Ulysses albums
Albums produced by Ian MacKaye